Diamond Plaza is one of the biggest shopping centres, located in downtown Mandalay near the Mandalay Central Railway Station. The complex consists of two towers: Tower A (Diamond Plaza) and Tower B (Yadanabon Super Centre).

References 

Buildings and structures in Mandalay
Retail companies of Myanmar
Retail companies established in 2012
Shopping malls established in 2012
2012 establishments in Myanmar